Beinn Odhar Bheag (882 m) is a mountain in the Northwest Highlands, Scotland, south of the village of Glenfinnan in Moidart, Lochaber.

A rugged peak, it towers over the western shore of Loch Shiel. Climbers should expect a rough route to the summit with many bogs on its lower slopes and few paths to its summit.

References

Mountains and hills of the Northwest Highlands
Marilyns of Scotland
Corbetts